The second season of CSI: Miami premiered on CBS on September 22, 2003, and ended May 24, 2004. The series stars David Caruso and Emily Procter.

Cast

Starring 
 David Caruso as Horatio Caine; an MDPD CSI Lieutenant, CSI Day Shift Supervisor, and the head of the Miami Dade Crime Lab. He is Calleigh's partner.
 Emily Procter as Calleigh Duquesne; an MDPD CSI Detective, ballistics analyst, and the Day Shift Assistant Supervisor; a role she inherited from Megan Donner during season 1. She is Horatio's partner.
 Adam Rodriguez as Eric Delko; an MDPD CSI Detective, underwater recovery expert, tire-tread analyst, and CSI Level III. He is Speedle's partner.
 Khandi Alexander as Alexx Woods; the MDPD's Medical Examiner. 
 Rory Cochrane as Tim Speedle; an MDPD CSI Detective, trace and fiber analyst, and CSI Level III. He is Delko's partner.

Recurring cast 
 Sofia Milos as Yelina Salas; Horatio's sister-in-law and a senior Robbery-Homicide Division (RHD) Detective assigned to assist the CSI's.
 Rex Linn as Frank Tripp; a senior Robbery-Homicide Division (RHD) Detective assigned to assist the CSI's.
 Holt McCallany as John Hagen; a senior Robbery-Homicide Division (RHD) Detective assigned to assist the CSI's.
David Lee Smith as Rick Stetler; an IAB officer.

Guest stars 
 Gary Sinise as Mac Taylor; a Detective First Grade and the Director of the NYPD Crime Lab.
 Melina Kanakaredes as Stella Bonasera; a Detective First Grade and NYPD CSI Assistant Supervisor.
 Carmine Giovinazzo as Danny Messer; a Detective Third Grade and NYPD CSI Level 3. 
 Vanessa Ferlito as Aiden Burn; a Detective Third Grade and NYPD CSI Level 2. 
 Hill Harper as Sheldon Hawkes; the New York Medical Examiner.

Episodes

References

02
2003 American television seasons
2004 American television seasons